ESPN Sunday Night NFL is a sports video game that was released for the Super NES, Sega CD, and Sega Genesis in 1994.

Summary
Like in other football games, the player must run, pass, and/or kick a ball across a regulation field spanning  in order to score points.

Weather conditions would vary, making the game have an element of realism that manipulates the football and the players. Chris Berman's voice was provided as the announcer of every game that the player participated in. All of the 28 teams that were in the NFL were during the early 1990s were in the game. However, the names of the individual players are not used due to the development company not being able to acquire the full NFLPA license.

It was the second in a chain of ESPN-themed sports games, following ESPN Baseball Tonight.

Reception
Reviewing the Genesis version, GamePro commented that ESPN Sunday Night NFL "lacks the well-crafted execution of Madden '95 or any number of other football games." They particularly criticized the lack of real players, the players' identical performance, the poor graphics, and the limited sound effects. Their review of the Super NES version declared it to be an improvement over the Genesis version, with better graphics, sounds, and playability. However, they stated the game is still mediocre in all those factors, particularly noting the excessive flicker and simplistic gameplay which appear in both versions of the game.

External links

See also
ESPN Sunday Night Football
NFL GameDay, Sony's successor for the PlayStation

References

1994 video games
ESPN video games
Sunday Night Nfl
North America-exclusive video games
Epic/Sony Records games
Professional football games set in the United States
Super Nintendo Entertainment System games
Video games set in 1994
Sega Genesis games
Sega CD games
Multiplayer and single-player video games
Video games developed in the United States
Absolute Entertainment games